Ferenc Kocsur (b? September 2, 1930 in Brunssum), d. 1990) also referred to as Jacques Koczur or Ferry, was a French-Hungarian footballer and manager who represented the France national football team.

References

External links
 
 
 Player profile at FFF 

1930 births
1990 deaths
French football managers
French footballers
France international footballers
French people of Hungarian descent
AS Saint-Étienne players
Ligue 1 players
OGC Nice players
People from Brunssum
Association football midfielders
Footballers from Limburg (Netherlands)
OGC Nice managers